Bang Pa-in is one of the 16 districts (amphoe) of Phra Nakhon Si Ayutthaya province, central Thailand.

History
Bang Pa-in was established in the Ayutthaya era in the name Khwaeng Uthai. In the Rattanakosin era Khwaeng Uthai was divided to be Khwaeng Uthai Noi and Uthai Yai. In 1910 Khwaeng Uthai Noi was changed status and renamed to Phra Ratchawang District. The district name was changed again to Bang Pa-in after the name of Bang Pa-in island in 1915.

Its name Bang Pa-in is believed to be distorted from Bang Phra In (บางพระอินทร์), literally meaning "place of Indra", refers to place of Inthraracha, the title of Songtham before became the king. It is believed that he was the son of Ekathotsarot and local woman named In (อิน) or O In (อออิน). 

Bang Pa-in in Ayutthaya era was once called Bang Kradan (บางกระดาน) or Bang Khadan (บางขดาน), which means "place of plain", since it was a spacious plain and a part of Thung Luang Field, a vast field of central region and Chao Phraya basin. It was also used as a place for royal water repellent ceremony during the flood season.

The historic building Bang Pa-in Royal Palace was built during the Prasat Thong's  reign, which was believed that he was a cousin to Songtham.

Geography
Neighboring districts are (from the north clockwise) Phra Nakhon Si Ayutthaya, Uthai and Wang Noi of Ayutthaya province, Khlong Luang of Pathum Thani province, and Bang Sai of Ayutthaya.

Administration
The district is divided into 18 sub-districts (tambon), which are further subdivided into 149 villages (muban). There are nine municipal (thesaban) areas, and nine tambon administrative organizations (TAO).

See also 
 Bang Pa-in Royal Palace

References

External links

Districts of Phra Nakhon Si Ayutthaya province